Improvisations are activities, of making and creating, in the moment and in response to the stimulus of one's immediate environment.

Improvisations may also refer to:

 Improvisations (Ravi Shankar album), 1962
 Improvisations (Stéphane Grappelli album), 1956
 Improvisations (Ran Blake & Jaki Byard album), 1981 
 Improvisations (Roscoe Mitchell album), 2013